The 2010 Crystal Palace Baltimore season is the fourth season of the franchise and is being played in the USSF Division 2 Pro League.

Conference table

Players

Current roster
as at April 8, 2010

References

Crystal Palace Baltimore
Crystal Palace Baltimore
USSF Division 2 Professional League
Crystal Palace